The Numa Numa Trail is a trail on Bougainville in Papua New Guinea that runs from Numa Numa on the east coast over the central mountains of Bougainville to Torokina on the western coast.

The trail was central to the Torokina perimeter defence during the initial phases of the Bougainville campaign during World War II with a number of battles fought along the trail.

Geography of Papua New Guinea
Hiking in Papua New Guinea